Agni  is a 1989 Telugu-language action film, produced by K. S. Prakash under the Sowbhagya Lakshmi Films banner and directed by K. Raghavendra Rao. It stars Nagarjuna, Shantipriya  and music composed by Hamsalekha.

Cast

Nagarjuna as Pawan Kumar
Shantipriya as Rekha / Chinnari
Rao Gopal Rao as K. D. K. Das
Satyanarayana as Ramachandraiah 
Vanisri as Seeta Mahalakshmi
Mohan Babu as Video Babu
Allu Ramalingaiyah  
Rallapalli as M. P. Joginadham
Brahmanandam as Sahayam 
Narra Venkateswara Rao as S. I. Babu Rao
Babu Antony 
P. J. Sarma 
Balaji as Kondababu
Jagga Rao 
Chidatala Appa Rao as Ice Ice
Telephone Satyanarayana
Silk Smitha 
Priyanka 
Satyapriya as Usharani
Kalpana Rai 
Baby Raasi

Soundtrack

Music composed by Hamsalekha. Music released on LEO Music Company.

References

Films directed by K. Raghavendra Rao
Films scored by Hamsalekha
1980s Telugu-language films